Acheng railway station is a railway station of Harbin–Suifenhe Railway and located in the Acheng District of Harbin, Heilongjiang province, China.

See also
Chinese Eastern Railway
South Manchuria Railway
South Manchuria Railway Zone

References

Railway stations in Heilongjiang
Railway stations in Harbin